Muhammad Ashraf Khan Rind is a Pakistani politician who had been a member of the Provincial Assembly of the Punjab from August 2018 till January 2023.

Political career

He was elected to the Provincial Assembly of the Punjab as a candidate of Pakistan Tehreek-e-Insaf from Constituency PP-279 (Muzaffargarh-XII) in 2018 Pakistani general election.

References

External links
"Mr. Muhammad Ashraf Khan Rind", Members' Directory, Provincial Assembly of the Punjab

Living people
Pakistan Tehreek-e-Insaf MPAs (Punjab)
Year of birth missing (living people)
People from Muzaffargarh
Politicians from Muzaffargarh